Lord Williams's School is a co-educational secondary school with academy status in Thame, Oxfordshire, England. The school takes children from the age of 11 through to the age of 18. The school has approximately 2,200 pupils.

In September 2001 the Department for Education and Skills (DfES) designated the school as a specialist Sports College.

Jon Ryder has been headteacher of the school since September 2019 after taking over from David Wybron.

History
Source:

The school opened in 1570, having been founded at the bequest of John Williams, 1st Baron Williams of Thame, after his death in 1559. A building with a single classroom, two rooms for the Master and Usher, and a dormitory for boarders was erected in 1569 close to St Mary's Church and adjacent to the almshouses (all can still be seen today). In 1575, the Statutes were published which not only laid out how the school should be run but established the connection with New College, Oxford that lasts to this day.

It was an Endowed grammar school supported by income from John Williams's bequests (an endowment) and fees paid by scholars. The first headmaster was Edward Harris, born in 1534 and a native of Thame. A note on one copy of the Statutes states: "On the Day before the feast of St Andrews [November 29] 1570, Edward Harris who had previously been elected master, took up his office of teaching in the newly completed school."

Across the seventeenth and eighteenth century, it had a history of educating scholars who went on to have significant national influence (as listed below). However, by the middle of the 19 century, its fortunes had declined and, in 1872, it was decided to temporarily close the school and make a fresh start on a site on the Oxford Road, Thame. The new buildings opened in 1879. Records show that by 1890 the school had 57 boarders and 7 day boys; over the next thirty years, the number of day boys increased and, by 1920, there were 61 boarders and 52 day boys on the roll.

From 1895, the school started to receive grants from the local educational authority to supplement its income and the school began to lose its independence. In the 1930s almost all the school's income was coming from the local authority. By the mid 1940s it became clear that the school could no longer remain independent. In 1947 it became a state school under the direction of the Oxfordshire Education Committee.

The roll increased rapidly and reached bursting point in 1960 when it stood at 200 and the school had to turn away pupils. The Education Committee announced that it would institute a building programme and double the school's size. The Committee also accepted the Governor’s recommendation that to preserve the essential characteristic of the school, the size of the Boarding House be increased to 90. In late 1963, these new buildings were opened and the roll increased again.

In 1966, the Education Committee privately announced that it was planning to turn Lord Williams's Grammar School into a single-sex comprehensive to be called Lord Williams's School and that a separate girls' comprehensive school would be built alongside the existing buildings.

However these plans were amended and in 1971 it became a co-educational comprehensive school when it merged with the Wenman School. The site of which became one part of the lower school, known as Lower School East, while Lower School West was established on the Oxford Road site alongside what was known as the Upper School. In 1995 Lower School West merged into another part of Upper School and Lower School East became the one site for years 7-9.

Currently, the school is still dual-site and the long awaited plans to have a single site on the Oxford Road have yet to be reached.

Boarding
Boys boarded at the school for over 400 years. When the new school opened in 1879 they boarded at Main House on the site of the current school. As their numbers increased in the 1960s, the older boys also used two residential houses close to the school – Greenacres and Highfield. In 1992, the boarding facility was closed and since then the school has admitted day students only.

Masters
1575: Edward Harris
1597: Richard Bouchier
1627: Hugo Evans
1647: William Ailiff
1655: Hugo Willis
1675: Thomas Middleton
1694: Henry Bruces
1727: William Lamplugh
1727: James Fussel
1729: Robert Wheeler
1729: John Kipling
1773: William Cooke
1786: William Stratford
1814: Timothy Tripp Lee
1841: Thomas B Fookes
1879: George Plummer

Headmasters
1891: Benjamin Sharp
1899: Alfred Shaw
1920: Walter Bye
1929: Arthur Dyer
1948: Hugh Mullens
1957: Jon Nelson
1965: Geoffrey Goodall
1979: Peter Wells
1985: David Kenningham

Headteachers
1997: Pat O'Shea
2000: Michael Spencer 
2005: David Wybron
2019: Jon Ryder

Drama Studio Fire 
On 30 June 2007 a fire broke out at the drama studio of the Lower School campus of Lord Williams School. The emergency services received a 999 call at 9.42pm although it is currently believed the fire had started at 8.30pm.

65 fire fighters from across the county were able to control the blaze and stop it from destroying a neighbouring building with fire fighters from Thame, Wheatley, Watlington and Slade Park, as well as teams from Buckinghamshire Fire & Rescue coming from Aylesbury, Brill, Princes Risborough and Waddesdon attending the blaze.

Causes 
Originally it was believed that arson was the cause but an electrical fire was not ruled out. However, in February 2008, a 23-year-old man called Craig Ford was found guilty of arson and sentenced to five years in prison.

The Phoenix Project
In early 2008, a project began to raise up to £1m in order to replace the drama studio with a new drama and dance studio, including a box office and permanent seating for the Thame Youth Theatre.

Notable Old Tamensians

Former pupils of the school are called Old Tamensians.

 John Balance, musician
 William Basse, poet
 Simon Burnett, swimmer
 Avril (April) Spary, TV Producer, BAFTA Winner for Murder in Successville
 Johnny Claes, musician and F1 racing driver
 Bertie Corbett, England Football International
 Rob Deering, comedian, guitarist and writer
 Ben Delo, computer scientist, philanthropist and co-founder of BitMEX
 Thomas Ellwood, religious writer
 George Etherege, dramatist
 John Fell, clergyman
 Sir Timothy Fraser, Royal Navy officer
 Gavin Free, actor, director, Internet personality
 Simon Gillett, professional footballer
 Jane Tewson, social activist, co-founder of Comic Relief
 Howard Goodall, musician and television presenter. Wrote the Blackadder theme tune
 Arthur Goodwin, politician
 Daniel Gruchy, Internet personality
 John Hampden, politician
 Sir John Holt Lord Chief Justice
 Richard Ingoldsby soldier and regicide
 Henry King, poet and Bishop of Chichester
 William Lenthall, politician
 Andrew Logan sculptor and founder of Alternative Miss World
 Shackerley Marmion, dramatist
 John Maxton, Lord Maxton, Labour MP for Glasgow Cathcart, 1979 - 2001.
 Simon Mayne, regicide
 Alan Niven, musician, composer, producer, rock n' roll manager
 Edward Pococke, Orientalist and biblical scholar
 Derek Teden England Rugby International
 John Voce, actor
 Paul Volley, rugby player
 Edmund Waller poet and politician
 Daniel Whistler physician and FRS
 Anthony Wood, antiquary
 John Woodvine, actor

References

External links 
 School website

Secondary schools in Oxfordshire
Training schools in England
Academies in Oxfordshire
School buildings in the United Kingdom destroyed by arson
Thame